Hip hop production is the creation of hip hop music in a recording studio. While the term encompasses all aspects of hip hop music creation, including recording the rapping of an MC, a turntablist or DJ providing a beat, playing samples and "scratching" using record players and the creation of a rhythmic backing track, using a drum machine or sequencer, it is most commonly used to refer to recording the instrumental, non-lyrical and non-vocal aspects of hip hop.

Music production
Hip hop producers may be credited as the record producer or songwriter; they may also supervise recording sessions.

Hip hop instrumentals are colloquially referred to as beats or musical compositions, while the composer is called either a programmer, songwriter or beat maker. In the studio, the hip hop producer often functions as both the composer and as a traditional record producer. They are sometimes called Orchestrators, P. Diddy is an example of one, and they are ultimately responsible for the final sound of a recording and providing guidance to the artists and performers. As well as advising the audio engineer on the selection of everything from microphones and effects processors to how to mix vocal and instrumental levels.

History

1980s 
The Roland TR-808 drum machine was introduced in 1980, and consisted on an analog machine with step programming method. The 808 was heavily used by Afrika Bambaataa, who released "Planet Rock" in 1982, in addition to the electro hip hip groundbreaking classic "Nunk" by Warp 9, produced by Lotti Golden and Richard Scher, giving rise to the fledgling Electro genre. An especially notable artist is the genre's own pioneer Juan Atkins who released what is generally accepted as the first American techno record, "Clear" in 1984 (later sampled by Missy Elliott). These early electro records laid down the foundations that later Detroit techno artists such as Derrick May built upon. In 1983, Run-DMC recorded "It's Like That" and "Sucker M.C.'s," two songs which relied completely on synthetic sounds, in this case via an Oberheim DMX drum machine, ignoring samples entirely. This approach was much like early songs by Bambaataa and the Furious Five.

Kurtis Blow was the first hip hop artist to use a digital sampler, when he used the Fairlight CMI for their 1984 album "Ego Trip", specially on the track "AJ Scratch". The E-mu SP-12 came out in 1985, capable of 2.5 seconds of recording time. The E-mu SP-1200 promptly followed (1987) with an expanded recording time of 10 seconds, divided on 4 banks. One of the earliest songs to contain a drum loop or break was "Rhymin and Stealin" by Beastie Boys, produced by Rick Rubin. Marley Marl also popularized a style of restructuring drum loops by sampling individual drums, in the mid-1980s, a technique which was popularized by the MC Shan's 1986 single "The Bridge" which used chops of "Impeach the President" on two Korg Delay/sampling triggered by a Roland TR-808. The Akai MPC60 came out in 1988, capable of 12 seconds of sampling time. Beastie Boys released Paul's Boutique in 1989, an entire album created completely from an eclectic mix of samples, produced by the Dust Brothers using an Emax sampler. De La Soul also released 3 Feet High and Rising that year.

1990s–present 
Public Enemy's Bomb Squad revolutionized the sound of hip-hop with dense production styles, combining tens of samples per song, often combining percussion breaks with a drum machine. Their beats were much more structured than the early more minimal and repetitive beats. The MPC3000 was released in 1994, the AKAI MPC2000 in 1997, followed by the MPC2000XL in 1999 and the MPC2500 in 2006. These machines combined a sampling drum machine with an onboard MIDI sequencer and became the centerpiece of many hip hop producers' studios. The Wu Tang Clan's producer RZA is often credited for getting hip hop attention away from Dr. Dre's more polished sound in 1993. RZA's more gritty sound with low rumbling bass, sharp snare drum sounds and unique sampling style based on Ensoniq sampler. With the 1994 release of The Notorious B.I.G.'s Ready to Die, Sean Combs and his assistant producers ushered in a new style where entire sections of records were sampled, instead of short snippets.

Records like "Warning" (Isaac Hayes's "Walk On By"), and "One More Chance (Remix)" (Debarge's "Stay With Me") epitomized this aesthetic. In the early 2000s, Roc-a-Fella in-house producer Kanye West made the "chipmunk" technique popular. This had been first used by 1980s electro hip-hop group Newcleus with such songs as "Jam on It".  This technique involves speeding up a vocal sample, and its corresponding instrumental loop, to the point where the vocal sounds high-pitched. The result is a vocal sample that sounds similar to the singing of the popular cartoon singing animals "Alvin and the Chipmunks". West adopted this style from J Dilla and the Wu-Tang Clan's RZA, who in turn was influenced by Prince Paul, the pioneer of the style of speeding up and looping vocal samples to achieve the "chipmunk" sound. Kanye West has used the "chipmunk" effect in many of his songs, and has been used in many other artists' music in the 2010s.

During the course of the 2010s, many chart-topping hits revolved around music producers using digital audio workstation software (for example FL Studio) to create songs from sampled sounds. Some prominent music producers include Sonny Digital, Mike Will Made It, Metro Boomin, WondaGurl, Zaytoven, Lex Luger, Young Chop, DJ L Beats, Tay Keith, and the birth of music producing groups such as 808Mafia, Winner's Circle, and Internet Money.

Elements

Drum beat

The drum beat is a core element of hip hop production. While some beats are sampled, others are created by drum machines. The most widely used drum machine is the analog Roland TR-808, which has remained a mainstay for decades. Digital samplers, such as the E-mu SP-12 and SP-1200, and the Akai MPC series, have also been used to sample drum beats. Others yet are a hybrid of the two techniques, sampled parts of drum machine beats that are arranged in original patterns altogether. The Akai MPC series and Ensoniq ASR-10 are mainstays for sampling beats, particularly by The Neptunes. Some beat makers and record producers are sound designers that create their own electronic drum kit sounds, such as Dr. Dre, Timbaland, DJ Paul & Juicy J, Swizz Beatz, Kanye West and The Neptunes. Some drum machine sounds, such as the 1980s-era TR-808 cowbell, remain as historical elements of hip hop lore that continue to be used in 2010s-era hip hop.

Sampling 

Sampling is using a segment of another's musical recording as part of one's own recording. It has been integral to hip hop production since its inception. In hip-hop, the term describes a technique of splicing out or copying sections of other songs and rearranging or reworking these sections into cohesive musical patterns, or "loops." This technique was first fully explored in 1982 by Afrika Bambaata, on the Soulsonic Force tape Planet Rock, which sampled parts of dance act Kraftwerk and experienced vast public acclaim. This was followed up on in 1986: then-Def Jam producer Rick Rubin used Black Sabbath and Led Zeppelin loops in creating the Beastie Boys' debut Licensed to Ill, and the following year rap duo Eric B. & Rakim popularized James Brown samples with their album Paid in Full.

The technique took a bi-coastal turn when discovered by a young Dr. Dre, whose first gig was the DJ of Afrika Bambaata-esque electrofunk group, the World Class Wreckin' Cru. In 1988, Dre began his use of sampling in hip-hop when he produced the N.W.A album Straight Outta Compton, a landmark in the genre of gangsta rap. In 1989, Jazz-sampling pioneers Gang Starr followed in 1991 by Pete Rock & CL Smooth and A Tribe Called Quest both appeared on the scene, popularizing their brand, and sampling took on a full role in hip-hop, spreading to prominence in high-profile projects like the Wu-Tang Clan's Enter the Wu-Tang: 36 Chambers, Dr. Dre's The Chronic, Nas' Illmatic and Notorious B.I.G.'s Ready to Die.

In the 2000s, sampling began to reach an all-time high; Jay-Z's album The Blueprint helped put producers Kanye West and Just Blaze on the map for their sampling of soul records. Kanye West himself scored early hits with "Through the Wire" and "Jesus Walks." His 2004 album, The College Dropout, included two sampled hits featuring Twista which led to the Chicago rapper's Kamikaze selling platinum. On September 7, 2004, however, a U.S. Court of Appeals in Nashville changed the nature of musical copyright infringement by ruling that a license is needed in every case of sampling, where previously a small portion of the song could be copied without repercussion. The law immediately began rarefying samples in hip-hop; in a 2005 interview with Scratch magazine, Dr. Dre announced he was moving more toward instrumentation, and in 2006 The Notorious B.I.G.'s 1994 debut album Ready to Die was temporarily pulled from shelves for a retroactive sample clearance issue. As a result, more major producers and artists have moved further away from sampling and toward live instrumentation, such as Wu-Tang's  RZA and Mos Def. There were often questions of originality and authenticity that followed the use of sampling.

Samplers 

Because hip hop production revolves around sampling, a sampler/sequencer combination device such as Akai's MPC line of grooveboxes usually forms the centerpiece of a hip hop production studio. Although mostly replaced by Digital Audio Workstations (DAWs) by today, classics like the E-mu Systems SP-1200, Akai MPC60, Akai MPC3000 or Ensoniq ASR-10 still see use today due to their workflow and sound characteristics.

Turntables 

The most widely used turntables in hip hop are Panasonic's Technics series. They were the first direct-drive turntables, which eliminated belts, and instead employed a motor to directly drive the platter on which a vinyl record rests. The Technics SL-1100 was adopted by early hip hop artists in the 1970s, due to its strong motor, durability and fidelity. A forefather of turntablism was DJ Kool Herc, an immigrant from Jamaica to New York City. He introduced turntable techniques from Jamaican dub music, while developing new techniques made possible by the direct-drive turntable technology of the Technics SL-1100, which he used for the first sound system he set up after emigrating to New York in the 1970s. The signature technique he developed was playing two copies of the same record on two turntables in alternation to extend the b-dancers' favorite section, switching back and forth between the two to loop the breaks to a rhythmic beat.

The most influential turntable was the Technics SL-1200. It was adopted by New York City hip hop DJs such as Grand Wizard Theodore and Afrika Bambaataa in the 1970s. As they experimented with the SL-1200 decks, they developed scratching techniques when they found that the motor would continue to spin at the correct RPM even if the DJ wiggled the record back and forth on the platter. Since then, turntablism spread widely in hip hop culture, and the SL-1200 remained the most widely used turntable in DJ culture for the next several decades.

Synthesizers 

Synthesizers are used often in hip hop production. They are used for melodies, basslines, as percussive "stabs", for chords and for sound synthesis, to create new sound textures. The use of synthesizers was popularized by Dr. Dre during the G-funk era. In the 2000s, Jim Jonsin, Cool and Dre, Lil Jon, Scott Storch, and Neptunes continue to use synths. Often in low-budget studio environments or recording rooms constrained by space limitations, the composer would use virtual instruments instead of hardware synthesizers. In the 2010s, virtual instruments are becoming more common in high-budget studio environments.

Recording 
In hip hop, a multi-track recorder is standard for recording. The Portastudio cassette recorder was the law in the in-house recording studios in the 1980s. Digital ADAT tape recorders became standard during the 1990s, but have been largely replaced by Digital Audio Workstations or DAWs such as Apple's Logic, Avid's Pro Tools and Steinberg's Nuendo and Cubase.  DAW's allow for more intricate editing and unlimited track counts, as well as built-in effects.  This allows songwriters and composer's to create music without the expense of a large commercial studio.

Vocal recording 
Generally, professional producers opt for a condenser microphone for studio recording, mostly due to their wide-range response and high quality. A primary alternative to the expensive condenser microphone is the dynamic microphone, used more often in live performances due to its durability. The major disadvantages of condenser microphones are their expense and fragility. Also, most condenser microphones require phantom power, unlike dynamic microphones. Conversely, the disadvantages of dynamic microphones are they do not generally possess the wide spectrum of condenser microphones and their frequency response is not as uniform. Many hip-hop producers typically used the Neumann U-87 for recording vocals which imparts a glassy "sheen" especially on female vocals. But today, many producers in this musical genre use the Sony C-800G tube microphone, vintage microphones, and high-end ribbon microphones tuned for flattering, "big" vocal expression.
Many classic hip-hop songs were recorded with the most basic of equipment. In many cases this contributes to its raw sound quality, and charm. A lot of recording engineers prefer using "dry" acoustics for hip hop to minimize the room reverberation.

Digital audio workstations 

DAWs and software sequencers are used in modern hip hop production for the composer as software production products are cheaper, easier to expand, and require less room to run than their hardware counterparts. The success of these DAWs generated a flood of new semi-professional beatmakers, who license their beats or instrumentals preferably on digital marketplaces to rap artists from all around the world and caused the creation of a new niche market. Some Beatmakers oppose complete reliance on DAWs and software, citing lower overall quality, lack of effort, and lack of identity in computer-generated beats. Sequencing software often comes under criticism from purist listeners and traditional producers as producing sounds that are flat, overly clean, overly compressed, and less human because it's all computer-generated.

Popular DAWs include the following:
Ableton Live
 Acoustica Mixcraft
Adobe Audition
Apple's Logic Pro
Avid Technology's Pro Tools
Cakewalk SONAR
Steinberg Cubase
Image-Line's FL Studio
Reason Studios
Sony ACID Pro
Apple's GarageBand
Motu Inc. Digital Performer
Cockos REAPER
Ardour

Live instrumentation 
Live instrumentation is not as widespread in hip hop, but is used by a number of acts and is prominent in hip hop-based fusion genres such as rapcore. Before samplers and synthesizers became prominent parts of hip hop production, early hip hop hits such as "Rapper's Delight" (The Sugarhill Gang) and "The Breaks" (Kurtis Blow) were recorded with live studio bands. During the 1980s, Stetsasonic was a pioneering example of a live hip hop band. Hip hop with live instrumentation regained prominence during the late-1990s and early 2000s with the work of The Goats, The Coup, The Roots, Mello-D and the Rados, Common, DJ Quik, UGK and OutKast, among others.  In recent years, The Robert Glasper Experiment has explored live instrumentation with an emphasis on the instrumental and improvisational aspect of hip hop with rappers such as Mos Def, Talib Kweli, Q-Tip, and Common as well as neo-soul singer Bilal Oliver.

Drumming and hip hop
Throughout history the drum set has taken numerous identities. It is the instrument that makes jazz "swing" and rock 'n' roll "rock." With a new age of pop music on the rise within the past decade, it is easy to assume the drum set has been replaced by electronic sounds produced by an engineer. In reality, the drum set is the reason behind the production of these electronic beats, and live drummers contribute to modern day hip-hop much more than what meets the ear.

An example of a drummer recording on a hip-hop record is Kendrick Lamar's album titled To Pimp A Butterfly which was released in 2015. Robert Sput Searight, drummer of Snarky Puppy, performed on the track's titled "For Free" and "Hood Politics." When performing live, Lamar would often employ a live band as opposed to most live hip-hop that use a pre-recorded backing track. The non-musician may find the use of a live drummer on a hip-hop recording unnoticeable, however, these musicians should receive credit for their work. The list below names some of the most influential drummers of the hip-hop genre.Other hip hop drummers include,
 Questlove
 J Dilla
 Pharrell Williams 
 Tony Royster Jr
 Chris Dave
 Karriem Riggins
 Adam Deitch

Instrumental hip hop 

Instrumental hip hop is hip hop music without vocals. Hip hop as a general rule consists of two elements: an instrumental track (the "beat") and a vocal track (the "rap"). The artist who crafts the beat is the producer (or beatmaker), and the one who crafts the rap is the MC (emcee). In this format, the rap is almost always the primary focus of the song, providing most of the complexity and variation over a fairly repetitive beat. Instrumental hip hop is hip hop music without an emcee rapping. This format gives the producer the flexibility to create more complex, richly detailed and varied instrumentals. Songs of this genre may wander off in different musical directions and explore various subgenres, because the instruments do not have to supply a steady beat for an MC. Although producers have made and released hip hop beats without MCs since hip hop's inception, those records rarely became well-known. Jazz keyboardist/composer Herbie Hancock and bassist/producer Bill Laswell's electro-inspired collaborations are notable exceptions. 1983's Future Shock album and hit single "Rockit" featured turntablist Grand Mixer D.ST, the first use of turntables in jazz fusion, and gave the turntablism and record "scratching" widespread exposure.

The release of DJ Shadow's debut album Endtroducing..... in 1996 saw the beginnings of a movement in instrumental hip hop. Relying mainly on a combination of sampled funk, hip hop and film score, DJ Shadow's innovative sample arrangements influenced many producers and musicians.

In the 2000s and 2010s, artists such as RJD2, J Dilla, Pete Rock, Large Professor, MF DOOM, Danny!, Nujabes, Madlib, Damu the Fudgemunk, Wax Tailor, Denver Kajanga, DJ Krush, Hermitude, Abstract Orchestra, and Blockhead have garnered critical attention with instrumental hip hop albums. Due to the current state of copyright law, most instrumental hip-hop releases are released on small, independent and underground labels. Producers often have difficulty obtaining clearance for the many samples found throughout their work, and labels such as Stones Throw are fraught with legal problems.

Types of producers 

In contemporary hip hop production, the title producer has become a catch-all term that could indicate one or many types of contributions to any particular project. It is further complicated by the fact that the music industry has only three main categories to identify musical contributions – artist, producer, and songwriter – which often overlap in 21st century music production. Below are some of the different facets of the contemporary hip hop producer; a single production credit can involve any number of these roles.

 Record producer: seasoned music studio personnel who provides creative and technical guidance to an artist, e.g. Rick Rubin.
 Executive producer: the topmost advisor on a project who facilitates business dealings and management; can also be a single creative visionary who brings together other producers and artists, e.g., Kendrick Lamar's curation of Black Panther.
 Primary artist: an instrumental hip hop artist, e.g., Madlib; also can include rap artists who contribute to composing some of their own music (as opposed to artists in other genres who are not generally given a producer credit if they write the music).
 Featured artist: prominent producers are often given a featured artist credit when they produce a song with the primary artist, e.g., Pete Rock featured on Run–DMC's "Down with the King."
 Beatmaker: composers who write music generally, either from scratch or with samples, employing a digital audio workstation and DJ skills including the use of drum machines and MIDI instrumentation, e.g. Murda Beatz.
 Composer/songwriter: personnel who write and compose a song's music and sometime lyrics in a more traditional sense; additionally, musicians who provide instrumentation.
 Sample producer: composers who write music for the purpose of being easily manipulated by other producers, e.g. Frank Dukes.
 Sampled artist: artists whose work is sampled by a producer (however, this is generally given a songwriter credit).
 Producer credited for "additional" or "miscellaneous" production: commonly, artists who provide instrumentation on a track, e.g. BADBADNOTGOOD on Daniel Caesar's "Get You;" can also indicate a sampled artist or any minor musical contribution.
 Remix artist: artists who remix other's work may be credited as a producer as opposed to the primary artist.

See also 
List of hip hop DJs and producers
Turntablism
Record producer
Electronic music
Audio engineer

Notes

References 

Dr Abidi : chirurgien esthetique Tunisie

 
 
Music production